Club Deportivo Buñol, commonly referred to as Buñol, is a Spanish football team based in Buñol in the autonomous Valencian Community. Founded in 1921, it plays in Regional Preferente – Group 2, holding home games at Campo de Fútbol Beltrán Báguena, with a capacity of 3,000 people.

History
In November 2020, Buñol were drawn with Elche CF in the first round of the 2020–21 Copa del Rey, which marked their first ever official match against a La Liga club. The match was played at the Ciudad Deportiva de Buñol and ended 2–1, with the host almost pulling off the upset as they led up to the 66th minute.

Seasons

11 seasons in Tercera División

Notable managers
 Fran Escribá

References

External links
  
 BDFutbol team profile
 Fútbol Regional team profile 

1921 establishments in Spain
Association football clubs established in 1921
Football clubs in the Valencian Community
Province of Valencia